The Botswana Stock Exchange (BSE) is a stock exchange located in Gaborone, Botswana. The Botswana share market was established in 1989 and became the Botswana Stock Exchange in 1994. It is governed by the Botswana Stock Exchange Act.

The BSE has 36 market listings and three stock indices: the Domestic company index (BSE DCI); the Foreign company index (BSE FCI), incorporating companies which are dual listed on the BSE and another stock exchange; and the All Company Index, which is a weighted average of the DCI and FCI.   As well as equities, bonds and Floating Rate Notes are traded. Private investors are estimated to account for under 10% of the total market capitalisation. Foreign-based mining companies make up over 90%.

The exchange's normal trading sessions are from 10:00 to 14:00 on all days of the week except Saturdays, Sundays and holidays declared by the Exchange in advance.

The licensing authority for brokers in Botswana is the Ministry of Finance. Membership may be corporate or individual .

List of companies

 Absa Bank Botswana
Access Bank Botswana
 Botswana Insurance Holdings Limited
 Botswana Telecommunications Corp Ltd
 Chobe Holdings Ltd
 Choppies Enterprises Ltd
Cresta Marakanelo Limited
 Engen Botswana Limited
 Far Property Company Ltd
 First National Bank of Botswana
 Funeral Services Group Ltd
 Furnmart Ltd
 G4S Botswana Ltd
 Imara Holdings Limited
 Letshego
 PrimeTime Property Holding Limited
 RDC Properties Limited
  Sechaba Brewery Holdings Limited
 Sefalana Holding Company Limited
 Shumba Energy Ltd
 Standard Chartered Bank Botswana Limited
 Turnstar Holdings Limited

See also 
 List of African stock exchanges
 List of stock exchanges in the Commonwealth of Nations
 Economy of Botswana

References

External links
Botswana Stock Exchange

Financial services companies established in 1995
Stock exchanges in Botswana
Companies of Botswana
Economy of Botswana
Economy of Gaborone
Organizations established in 1995